Hamsin is a 1982 Israeli drama film directed by Daniel Wachsmann. The film was selected as the Israeli entry for the Best Foreign Language Film at the 55th Academy Awards, but was not accepted as a nominee.

Cast
 
 Yasein Shawaf
 Ruth Geller as Malka
 Hemda Levi as Hava

See also
 List of submissions to the 55th Academy Awards for Best Foreign Language Film
 List of Israeli submissions for the Academy Award for Best Foreign Language Film

References

External links
 

1982 films
1982 drama films
Israeli drama films
1980s Hebrew-language films
Films directed by Daniel Wachsmann